Billbergia manarae is a plant species in the genus Billbergia. This species is endemic to Venezuela.

References

manarae
Flora of Venezuela